Xuemei Chen (born 1966) is a Chinese-American molecular biologist. She is the Furuta Chair Professor in the Department of Botany and Plant Sciences at the University of California, Riverside. She was elected to the US National Academy of Sciences in 2013.

Early life and education
Chen tied the top high school exam score in her province and was allowed to study plant physiology at Peking University, where she graduated in 1988. The China-United States Biochemistry Examination and Application program awarded her a scholarship to graduate school at Cornell University. While at Cornell's Boyce Thompson Institute she studied the gene expression of chloroplasts and earned her Ph.D. in 1995. Her postdoctoral work was carried out (studying the genetics of floral patterning) at the California Institute of Technology.

Career
In 1999 Chen started work as an assistant professor at Rutgers University's Waksman Institute of Microbiology. In 2002 she was part of a team that discovered that MicroRNA existed in plants. This work led her to win the 2005 Board of Trustees' Research Fellowship for Scholarly Excellence concurrent with a promotion to associate professor; in 2005 she moved to University of California, Riverside (UCR) and was promoted to full professor in 2009. In 2011 she was named a fellow of the American Association for the Advancement of Science for "pioneering discoveries in the field of plant biology in small RNA metabolism and plant development." That year she was also named a Plant Biology Investigator (an award of ) by the Howard Hughes Medical Institute and the Gordon and Betty Moore Foundation. In 2013 Chen was elected to the National Academy of Sciences: the third member from UCR's Center for Plant Cell Biology and sixth from the university's College of Natural and Agricultural Sciences.

Publications

References

1966 births
Living people
Scientists from Harbin
University of California, Riverside faculty
Peking University alumni
Cornell University alumni
Rutgers University faculty
Plant physiologists
Chinese emigrants to the United States
American women biologists
Chinese women biologists
Members of the United States National Academy of Sciences
American molecular biologists
Chinese molecular biologists
Educators from Heilongjiang
Biologists from Heilongjiang
Chinese science writers
Writers from Harbin
American women academics
21st-century American women